Ichuña District is one of eleven districts of the General Sánchez Cerro Province in Peru.

Geography 
Some of the highest peaks of the district are listed below:

Ethnic groups 
The people in the district are mainly indigenous citizens of Quechua descent. Quechua is the language which the majority of the population (79.61%) learnt to speak in childhood, 12.86% of the residents started speaking using the Spanish language (2007 Peru Census).

See also
 Jukumarini Lake

References